Telmatobius mayoloi is a species of frog in the family Telmatobiidae.
It is endemic to Peru.
Its natural habitats are subtropical or tropical high-altitude grassland and rivers. This species is primarily found in central Peru. They can also be found in Andes, Ecuador, Chile, and Argentina in high elevation areas ranging from 1,300 to 5,400 meters high.

Telmatobius mayoloi, including the tadpoles, are used for food and medicine.

Telmatobius mayoloi have been significantly declining in the past recent years. They are also expected to continue declining in population for the next 10 years. If this occurs, it could pose serious threats to the environment.

References

mayoloi
Amphibians of the Andes
Amphibians of Peru
Endemic fauna of Peru
Amphibians described in 1996
Taxonomy articles created by Polbot